Cornelis van der Geest (1555 – 10 March 1638) was a spice merchant from Antwerp, who used his wealth to support the Antwerp artists and to establish his art collection. He was also the dean of the haberdashers guild.

Art collection
He is best known today for his art collection. He was portrayed repeatedly by Anthony van Dyck, while Willem van Haecht, whom he had hired as curator, painted his "constcammer" several times, including a view of the visit of Albert VII, Archduke of Austria and Isabella Clara Eugenia to his art collection.

He owned two paintings by Quentin Matsys, one of which, a Madonna, can be seen in the Van Haecht painting. Other works included in that view are Women at her toilet by Jan van Eyck, a still life by Frans Snyders, Ceres Mocked by Adam Elsheimer, Danaë by Van Haecht, Battle of the Amazons and a portrait by Peter Paul Rubens, Peasant Company with Woman making Pancakes by Pieter Aertsen, Apelles by Jan Wierix and a hunting scene by Jan Wildens. The painting also shows some of Van der Geest's sculptures, with copies of the Venus de' Medici, the Farnese Hercules, and the Apollo Belvedere.

Paintings by Willem van Haecht of his art gallery:

Paintings hanging in his art gallery followed by the numbers of the five gallery paintings above:

Maecenas

Van der Geest also functioned as a maecenas. He arranged for Rubens to get the order for a triptych for the Saint Walpurga church in Antwerp, which resulted in the Elevation of the Cross, now in the Cathedral of Antwerp. Similarly, the order for the 1630-1632 Triptych of Saint Ildephonsus, intended for the Saint James church, but now in the Kunsthistorisches Museum in Vienna, was given to Rubens through the influence of Van der Geest.
Van der Geest also financed a new memorial for Quentin Metsys against the tower of the Antwerp Cathedral.

See also
Portrait of a Commander, a portrait owned by van der Geest.

Notes

External links

 Love in the Kunstkamer in fine arts magazine Tableau, by Gary Schwartz
 Willem van Haecht schilderde in 1628 de constkamer van cornelis van der geest; een multi-interpreteerbaar tijdsdocument, Dutch article about painting (5) in magazine Vlaanderen, Jaargang 43, 1994

1577 births
1638 deaths
Art collectors from Antwerp
Flemish merchants
Businesspeople from Antwerp
17th-century merchants
Paintings of art galleries